The Stickeen  Territories , also colloquially rendered as Stickeen Territory, Stikine Territory, and Stikeen Territory, was a  territory of British North America whose brief existence began July 19, 1862, and concluded July of the following year. The region was split from the North-Western Territory in the wake of the Stikine Gold Rush. The initial strike attracted large numbers of miners — mostly American — to the region; by detaching the region from the exclusive trade zone of the Hudson's Bay Company, British authorities were able to impose tariffs and licences on the speculators. The new territory, named after the Stikine River, was under the responsibility of the Governor of the Colony of British Columbia, James Douglas, who was appointed "Administrator of the Stickeen Territories" and under British law, within the jurisdiction of the Supreme Court of British Columbia.  

The boundaries of the territory were the 62nd parallel to the north, the 125th meridian to the east, the Nass and Finlay Rivers to the south, and the panhandle of Russian America to the west (only vaguely defined by treaty and disputed until resolved with the Alaska Boundary Settlement of 1903).

A year later, the Stickeen was added to the Colony of British Columbia (along with the Colony of the Queen Charlotte Islands), except for the sector north of the 60th parallel, which was returned to the North-Western Territory. In 1895, most of this strip was again redistributed, this time to the District of Yukon, as newly constituted during the midst of the Klondike Gold Rush. The remainder of the strip stayed in the Northwest Territories.

See also

Alaska boundary dispute
Fort Stikine
North-Western Territory
Stikine Country
Stikine Gold Rush
Stikine Region
Stikine River

References

Hudson's Bay Company
Pre-Confederation British Columbia
British North America
Stikine Country
States and territories established in 1862
1862 establishments in the British Empire
Former British colonies and protectorates in the Americas